"Je l'aime à mourir" is a French-language song written by Francis Cabrel. It is taken from his second album Les Chemins de traverse released in 1979 that sold over 600,000 copies in France. The single "Je l'aime à mourir" became a hit single for Francis Cabrel in France, Quebec (Canada), Europe and internationally. Spanish singer Manzanita interpreted the song to Spanish flamenco audience making the hit song popular again for the second time.  It is considered Cabrel's most definitive hit alongside "Je t'aimais, je t'aime, je t'aimerai".

Track listing
The original single contained "Les chemins de traverse" on the B-side  
"Je l'aime à mourir (2:42)	
"Les chemins de traverse" (3:00)

The song also appears on a number of Cabrel's compilations like Cabrel 77–87 (1987), Cabrel public (1984) and others.

Sales
In France the single sold 600,000 copies, making it to the top of the French Singles & Airplay Chart Reviews, staying at number one for five consecutive weeks (charts of 7, 14, 21 and 28 September and 6 October 1979). The single became the most sold Cabrel single ever.

Spanish version: "La Quiero a Morir"

Based on the popularity of the song, Cabrel commissioned Luis Gómez Escolar to translate the song. Cabrel recorded the Spanish-language version of the song called "La Quiero a Morir" that was released  in 1980 with the B-side containing a Spanish translation of the French B-side release "Les chemins de traverse" as "Los Caminos Que Cruzan": 
"La Quiero a Morir" (2:42)
"Los Caminos Que Cruzan" (3:00)

The song also appeared in Cabrel's 1990 Spanish-language album Algo más de amor.

Versions
In 1979, Cabrel made his first rerecording of the original song in French.
In 1980, Cabrel released Spanish translation under the Spanish title "La quiero a morir" in his all-Spanish-language album Algo más de amor.
In 1981, the Czech songwriter and guitar player Lenka Filipová recorded it as Zamilovaná in the same name LP along with another Francis Cabrel's song (Přestaň si hrát na trápení: Une star à sa façon). It became a hit in Czechoslovakia.
In 1986, Sergio Vargas recorded the Spanish version in merengue for his debut studio album La Quiero a Morir.  His version peaked at #22 on the Hot Latin Tracks chart. It was the first of three Cabrel's songs recorded by Vargas. Later he recorded "Si algún día la ves / Si tu la croises un jour" y "Todo aquello que escribí / "L'encre de tes yeux".
In 1990 the Canadian Rock Voisine released an English version named Until Death Do Us Part write by James Campbell on his album Double
The Haitian-Canadian singer Marc-Antoine covered the song in French.
In 1997, American band Dark Latin Groove (DLG) performed "La quiero a morir" in salsa for their second studio album Swing On which was produced by Sergio George with the lead vocals done by Huey Dunbar. Their version peaked at number six at the Hot Latin Tracks and became their third number-one single on the Billboard Tropical Songs chart. A music video for their cover was filmed. In 2008, the group re-recorded the song on their fourth studio album Renacer with the lead vocals done by Miss Yaya.
In 1998, Puerto Rican-American singer Gisselle performed the song as "Lo Quiero a Morir" on the collaboration album Juntos (1998) with Sergio Vargas. Gisselle's cover peaked at #16 on the Tropical Songs chart.
In 2007, Jonas Tomalty re-recorded Rock Voisine's English version on his album Promised Land
In 2007, The granadino band El Puchero del Hortelano covered the song in their fourth album Harumaki.
Other Spanish versions include: Manzanita (singer) in Flamenco, Sergio Dalma, Camilo Sesto, Muchachito bombo infierno and Raphael
In 2008, Quentin Mosimann included it in his album Duel
In 2008, Les Enfoirés included a multilingual version in the 17th album Les Secrets des Enfoirés recorded during seven concerts they performed at the Zénith in Strasbourg (23–28 January 2008), reaching platinum status. "Je l'aime à mourir" was performed as a medley with the following: Kad Merad (endormie version), Jean-Jacques Goldman, Michael Jones (jazz), Gérard Jugnot (Japanese version), Mimie Mathy (hard rock version), Patrick Fiori (opera version), Jean-Baptiste Maunier (rap version) and finally Francis Cabrel, Kad Merad, Pascal Obispo and Public (original version).
In 2011, Jarabe De Palo covered the song with Alejandro Sanz on their 2011 album ¿Y Ahora Qué Hacemos?
In 2012, Shakira covered this song in Paris, Bercy.
In 2018, Pol Granch performed a bilingual cover in Spanish and French during the second live show of the third series of Factor X.
In 2018, Shakira sang the French version of the song in her stops (Antwerp, Paris, Luxembourg, Zürich, Bordeaux, Montpellier and Montréal) on El Dorado World Tour.
In 2020, Latin American boy band CNCO recorded a version of "La Quiero a Morir" for their cover album Déjà Vu

Alliage version

The French boy band Alliage recorded a cover of the song on their second album Musics. It proved popular on French radio reaching #1 in airplay charts in France. "Je l'aime à mourir" was the third and last single from the album after "Je sais" and "Cruel Summer" a bilingual take on the Ace of Base classic done by Alliage and Ace of Base.

Track listing
"Je l'aime à mourir" (Radio Version) (2:50)	
"Je l'aime à mourir" (Unplugged Version) (2:50)

Charts
The Alliage version of "Je l'aime à mourir" had relative chart success peaking at #30 in France and #39 in Belgium's francophone chart.

Shakira version

"Je l'aime à mourir" is a bilingual Spanish and French cover version of the song by Colombian singer-songwriter Shakira. She performed the song during her concerts in French-speaking countries on the second European leg of her The Sun Comes Out World Tour, dating 2011. Two of these concerts, in Paris-Bercy, were filmed for the tour's official DVD and Blu-ray. Shortly before the DVD/Blu-ray's release, a studio-recorded version of the song leaked, and was later officially released as the second single from Live from Paris. It was very well received by critics and by all her fans. The song has over 5,000,000 views on different channels on YouTube as of June 2012. In early December, the song promoted a Google Plus campaign for Shakira.

Chart performance

The promotional single debuted at number fifty-six on the Billboard Canadian Hot 100 for the week-ending 17 December 2011, thus becoming one of Shakira's highest debuts on the survey. It has also entered the French Airplay Top 200 where it received moderate airplay from Classic pop radio stations. In France, the song debuted at number one on the singles chart, selling 11,958 downloads, the song was number 1 in France for seven weeks.

Music video
An official video was released on 22 December 2011 on YouTube and VEVO, the cut is part of the DVD of the live album Live from Paris. This video was only available for France and Switzerland, but in early 2012 the video was available worldwide.

Live performances
Shakira sang the song for the first time during the dates of the tour "The Sun Comes Out World Tour" in France and Switzerland (5 to 8 June 2011 and 11 to 14 June 2011). She also performed the song during the NRJ Music Award in France. This performance was similar to what she had done during the Latin Grammy in 2011; Shakira performed the song while playing an acoustic guitar version, mixing the original French lyrics with Spanish lyrics.

Formats and track listings

Charts and sales

Charts

Year-end chart

Certifications

Release history

See also
List of French number-one hits of 1979
List of Billboard Tropical Airplay number ones of 1997
List of French number-one hits of 2011
List of French number-one hits of 2012
List of Ultratop 40 number-one singles of 2011
List of Ultratop 40 number-one singles of 2012

References

1979 singles
Francis Cabrel songs
Dark Latin Groove songs
SNEP Top Singles number-one singles
Ultratop 50 Singles (Wallonia) number-one singles
Shakira songs
2011 singles
Songs written by Francis Cabrel
Song recordings produced by Sergio George
1986 singles
1997 singles
1998 singles
1979 songs
CBS Records singles
Sony Discos singles